Afghani may refer to:

Afghan afghani, the official currency of Afghanistan
 An Afghan, a person or thing of, from, or related to Afghanistan (although this usage is viewed as improper)
 al-Afghani, a nisba denoting a person from Afghanistan
 Pashto language
 Jamal al-Din al-Afghani, Muslim nationalist and modernist in the late 19th century
 Jamila Afghani, Afghan feminist and women's rights activist
 Sajjad Afghani, Pakistani militant

See also 

 
 
 Afghan (disambiguation)
 Ghani (disambiguation)